Valentine Simpson (15 August 1849 at Newington, London — 2 November 1915 at Fareham, Hampshire) was an English cricketer who played for Hampshire.

Simpson made a single first-class appearance in 1885. He scored seven runs in the first innings in which he batted and three runs in the second. Simpson took two catches during the match.

References

Valentine Simpson at Cricket Archive

1849 births
1915 deaths
English cricketers
Hampshire cricketers
People from Fareham